The Magna MILA Plus is a hybrid electric concept car developed by the Austrian automobile manufacturer Magna Steyr, presented at Geneva Motor Show in 2015.

History 
The seventh concept car “Mila” from the Austrian equipment supplier is designed on a chassis structure in aluminum, for a low total weight of 1,520 kg, with roof and rear fastback fully glazed, and materials largely recyclables.

References 

Cars introduced in 2015
Mila Plus
Hybrid electric vehicles
Sports cars